Gaohuang is a town in Panji District, Huainan, Anhui. , it administers Qianwei Residential Community and the following 24 villages:
Gaohuang Village
Shunhe Village
Zhugang Village
Houji Village
Minzhu Village
Daji Village
Longwo Village
Sungang Village
Caoyin Village
Laowei Village
Suju Village
Xiangdong Village
Duangang Village
Shengli Village
Zhaogang Village
Waxi Village
Huaishang Village
Antai Village
Duanwan Village
Guangming Village
Zhakou Village
Zhanggang Village
Huji Village
Laohu Village

References

Panji District
Township-level divisions of Anhui